John Francis Zalusky (June 22, 1879 – August 11, 1935) was a professional baseball catcher. He played part of one season of Major League Baseball with the New York Highlanders, now known as the New York Yankees, playing in seven games  during the 1903 season.

External links

Major League Baseball catchers
New York Highlanders players
Grand Rapids Furniture Makers players
Minneapolis Millers (baseball) players
Spokane Indians players
Fort Dodge Gypsum Eaters players
Oskaloosa Quakers players
Indianapolis Indians players
St. Paul Saints (AA) players
Rock Island Islanders players
Denver Grizzlies (baseball) players
La Crosse Outcats players
Baseball players from Minnesota
1879 births
1935 deaths